The 1943 Georgia Bulldogs football team represented the Georgia Bulldogs of the University of Georgia during the 1943 college football season.

Schedule

References

Georgia
Georgia Bulldogs football seasons
Georgia Bulldogs football